Ali Asgar Annabestani (born 1972 in Annabestan, Razavi Khorasan) was governor of  Chaharmahal and Bakhtiari Province from 2010 to 2013.

References

1972 births
Governors of Chaharmahal and Bakhtiari Province
Living people